Eva María Isanta Foncuberta (born 19 June 1971) is a Spanish actress, known mostly for her roles as Beatriz Villarejo in Aquí no hay quien viva, and Maite Figueroa in La que se avecina.

She debuted on 31 October 1990 playing Inés in Don Juan Tenorio. From 1991 to 1992 she played Sara in Trescientos veintiuno, trescientos veintidós, by Ana Diosdado. In 1997 she performed with Ramón Langa and Paca Gabaldón in Asesino (2000), directed by Ricard Reguant. On 5 August 2011 she appeared with Pablo Carbonell, Marina San José and Carlos Heredia in Venecia bajo la nieve, by Gilles Dyrek and directed by Gabriel Olivares.

In 2017 she was awarded by the Premio Festival MIM Series for the best female performance in a comedy.

In 2019 she was cast to the Spanish TV programme Got Talent España with Risto Mejide, Jorge Javier Vázquez and Edurne.

Filmography

Films

TV series

References

External links

 

1971 births
Living people
People from Ceuta
Actors from Ceuta
21st-century Spanish actresses
Spanish television actresses